Kriváň can refer to:
 Kriváň (peak), peak in the High Tatras, Slovakia
 Veľký Kriváň, the highest peak in Malá Fatra, Slovakia
 Kriváň (village), village in Slovakia in the Detva District

See also 
 Crivina (disambiguation) (Romanian toponym)